Sport Lisboa e Benfica, commonly known as Benfica, is a semi-professional billiards team based in Lisbon, Portugal. Founded in 1938, Benfica compete in the Portuguese Billiards League, in carom billiards (three-cushion), pool (eight-ball and nine-ball), and snooker events. The team is almost exclusively composed of Portuguese players. They play at the Estádio da Luz in a 202 square meters room with 4 professional pool tables and a 50 people stand.

History 
The billiard section was created in 1938–39 with players like Alvaro Figueiredo de Lima, Maximiano Varges Henrique da Costa Santos and Aguinaldo Cacho. The section continued to grow and in the sixties it won its first regional title in 66/67 and by 69 its first National Championship. Also in 69 it participated for the first time into the CEB European Three-cushion Championship. 

Between 1983 and 2000, Benfica won most of its titles, 10 Regional Championships, 6 National Championships, 2 Portuguese Cups and 3 Supercups.

In 2002/03, Benfica hired Dick Jaspers, Dion Nelin, Henrique Penalva, Jaime Faraco in an attempt to win the CEB European Three-cushion Championship but it only managed a second place.

In 2011/12, Benfica won a combined number of 13 titles, 9 for teams.

Men's honours
According to Benfica's official website

Three Cushin
 Portuguese Three-cushion Men's Billiards Championship
 Winners (9): 1968–69, 1970–71, 1976–77, 1984–85, 1985–86, 1986–87, 1988–89, 1991–92, 1994–95

 Portuguese Three-cushion Men's Billiards Cup
 Winners (2): 1992–93, 1999–2000

 Portuguese Three-cushion Men's Billiards Super Cup
 Winners (3): 1992–93, 1994–95, 1997–98

 Lisbon Regional Three-cushion Men's Billiards Championship
 Winners (15): 1966–67, 1970–71, 1973–74, 1974–75, 1975–76, 1982–83, 1983–84, 1985–86, 1986–87, 1987–88, 1988–89, 1991–92, 1992–93, 1993–94, 1994–95

 CEB European Three-cushion Championship:
 Runners-up: 2002–03

Pool

 Portuguese Pool Men's Billiards Cup
 Winners (1): 2010–11, 2011–12

 Portuguese Pool Men's Billiards Super Cup
 Winners (3): 2011–12

American Pool

 Portuguese American Pool Men's Billiards Championship
 Winners (1): 2011–12

 Portuguese American Pool Men's Billiards Cup
 Winners (1): 2010–11, 11–12

 Portuguese American Pool Men's Billiards Super Cup
 Winners (1): 2011–12

Snooker

 Portuguese Snooker Men's Billiards Championship
 Winners (2): 2011–12, 2013–14

 Portuguese Snooker Men's Billiards Championship
 Winners (2):  2013, 2014

Women's honours

Pool
 Portuguese Pool Women's Billiards Championship
  Winners (1): 2011–12

 Portuguese Pool Women's Billiards Cup
 Winners (1): 2010–11, 2011–12

Current squad

Notable past athletes

Alvaro Figueiredo de Lima
Maximiano Varges Henrique da Costa Santos
Aguinaldo Cacho
Manuel Rodriguez
José Tavares
Alvaro Lima
Artur Ribeiro
Eduardo Martins
José Alabern
Alvaro Araujo de Oliveira
Alfredo Ferraz
Jorge Pinto
Dr. Joaquim Lourenço Gago
João Pereira
Manuel Barroso Sanchez
 Victor Hugo Leal
Vladimiro Correia Monteiro
Carlos Alberto França
Ilídio Gomes
Mário Machado
Vladimiro Monteiro
Mário Ribeiro
Victor Hugo Leal

Technical staff

References

External links
  

Billiards
Sport in Lisbon
Cue sports teams
1938 establishments in Portugal
Cue sports in Portugal